Jucundus (variants include Giocondo, Iocundus, Iucundus, Jocund, Jucundus, Jukund), is a given name or surname of several people and of similar Christian saints. It may refer to:

Saints
Saint Giocondiano (3rd century), martyr in Africa. His feast is celebrated on 4 July
Saint Jucunda (4th century – 466). His feast is celebrated on 25 November
Saint Jucunda, martyr in Nicomedia. His feast is celebrated on 27 July
Saint Jucundus (3rd century – 250), martyr in Africa. His feast is celebrated on 9 January
 (4th century – c. 407), bishop of Aosta, Ursus of Aosta served as his Archdeacon. A companion of Gratus of Aosta to the Holy Land, he was killed with Saint Nicasius at Rheims in the fifth century. His feast day is celebrated on 30 December
Saint Jucundus (or Iocundus), of Bologna (c. 5th century), bishop of Bologna. His feast day is celebrated on 14 November
Saint Jucundus of Sirmium (4th century), martyr in Pannonia. His feast is celebrated on 6 January
Saint Jucundus of Troyes (3rd century – 273), martyr in Troyes. His feast is celebrated on 21 July

People
Francesco del Giocondo (1465–15th or 16th century), Florentine silk merchant, politician, and patron of the Arts
Gioconda Belli (born 1948), Nicaraguan author, novelist, and poet
Gioconda de Vito (1907–1994), Italian-British classical violinist
Giocondo Albertolli (1742–1840), Swiss-born architect, painter, and sculptor who was active in Italy
Giovanni Giocondo (Friar Giovanni Giocondo, O.F.M.; 1430s–1510s), Italian friar, architect, antiquary, archaeologist, and classical scholar
Joyce Lussu (born Gioconda Beatrice Salvadori Paleotti; 1912–1998), Italian writer, translator, and partisan
Jucundus, 5th-century Bishop of Sufetula (modern-day Sbeitla, Tunisia)
Lisa del Giocondo (1479–16th-century), (also known as Lisa Gherardini, Lisa di Antonio Maria (or Antonmaria) Gherardini and Mona Lisa; 1479–1542 or c. 1551), a member of the Gherardini family of Florence and Tuscany in Italy

Art
Gioconda's Smile (1965), a 1965 album by Greek composer Manos Hadjidakis
La Gioconda (opera) (1876), an 1876 opera in four acts by Amilcare Ponchielli set to an Italian libretto by Arrigo Boito, based on Angelo, tyran de Padoue, a play in prose by Victor Hugo
Mona Lisa (The Mona Lisa, La Gioconda, La Joconde, or Portrait of Lisa Gherardini, wife of Francesco del Giocondo; c. 1503–1519), half-length portrait of a woman by Leonardo da Vinci.

See also
Happiness
La Gioconda (disambiguation)